Janmandharam is a 1988 Indian Malayalam-language film, directed by Thampi Kannanthanam and produced by Thampi Kannanthanam. The film stars Balachandra Menon, Shobana, Ashokan and Siddique in the lead roles. The film has musical score by S. P. Venkatesh.

Cast
 
Balachandra Menon as Police Officer 
Shobhana as Sridevi 
Ashokan as Hari 
Siddique as Abdu 
Vineeth as Unnikrishnan 
M. G. Soman as Panikkar 
K. B. Ganesh Kumar as Murali 
Ramya Krishnan as Rekha 
Kuthiravattam Pappu as Kuruppilli Kuriakose 
Mala Aravindan as Karunan 
Adoor Bhavani as Aliyamma 
C. I. Paul as Bappu 
Nanditha Bose 
Paravoor Bharathan

Soundtrack
The music was composed by S. P. Venkatesh.

References

External links
 

1988 films
1980s Malayalam-language films
Films directed by Thampi Kannanthanam